In Greek mythology, Aglaonoe (Ancient Greek: Αγλαονόη) was one of the Sirens. She was the daughter of the river-god Achelous and the Muse Terpsichore. Her sisters were Aglaopheme and Thelxiepeia.

Note

Reference 

 John Tzetzes, Book of Histories, Book V-VI translated by Konstantinos Ramiotis from the original Greek of T. Kiessling's edition of 1826.  Online version at theio.com.

Sirens (mythology)
Children of Achelous
Women in Greek mythology